The 2016 Judo Grand Prix Havana was held at the Coliseo de la Ciudad Deportiva in Havana, Cuba from 22 to 24 January 2016.

Medal summary

Men's events

Women's events

Source Results

Medal table

References

External links
 

2016 IJF World Tour
2016 Judo Grand Prix
Judo
Judo competitions in Cuba
Judo